The 1942 municipal election was held November 12, 1942 to elect a mayor and five aldermen to sit on Edmonton City Council, three trustees to sit on the public school board and five trustees to sit on the separate school board.  Voters also approved an eight-hour day for firefighters.  The election would normally have been held on November 11 (the rule at the time being that the municipal election would be held on the second Wednesday of November), but was delayed by a day owing to the Armistice Day holiday.

There were ten aldermen on city council, but five of the positions were already filled: Harry Ainlay (SS), James McCrie Douglas (SS), Gwendolen Clarke, Charles Gariepy, Guy Patterson were all elected to two-year terms in 1941 and were still in office.

There were seven trustees on the public school board, but four of the positions were already filled: Melvin Downey (SS), Roy Sutherland, Albert Ottewell (SS), and James Hyndman had been elected to two-year terms in 1941 and were still in office.  On the separate board, two of the seven seats were occupied: Thomas Malone and William Wilde (SS) had been elected in 1941 and were still in office.  Robert Tighe and Romeo Bouchard had also been elected in 1941, but Tighe had died and Bouchard had resigned.  Accordingly, Joseph Gallant and J O Pilon were elected to one-year terms.

Voter turnout

There were 8,208 ballots cast out of 57,889 eligible voters, for a voter turnout of 14.2%.

Results

 bold or  indicates elected
 italics indicate incumbent
 "SS", where data is available, indicates representative for Edmonton's South Side, with a minimum South Side representation instituted after the city of Strathcona, south of the North Saskatchewan River, amalgamated into Edmonton on February 1, 1912.

Mayor

John Wesley Fry was acclaimed to a sixth term as mayor.

Aldermen

Public school trustees

Separate (Catholic) school trustees

Firefighter Work Hours Plebiscite

Do you approve of Bylaw No. 1019, establishing an eight-hour day for the members of the Edmonton Fire Department, to commence within one year next following the cessation of hostilities in the present war?
Yes - 5,818
No - 2,262

References

Election History, City of Edmonton: Elections and Census Office

1942
1942 elections in Canada
1942 in Alberta